Church of Santa Eulalia of the Monastery of Arnoso is a church in Vila Nova de Famalicão, Portugal. It was classified as a National Monument in 1938.

History 

The original church was founded in the 7th century on the initiative of San Frutuoso, Bishop of Dume and Braga during the Visigoth era, and destroyed by the Moors in the 11th century. It was later rebuilt by King García II of Galicia.

Architecture 
It is a simple church in early Romanesque style with a nave, a barrel vault and a rectangular apse with blind arches. The wooden portal consist of round arches and a tympanum with a cross pattée. These round arches are profusely decorated with geometric, intertwined and zoomorphic elements.

Inside the church there are a few sixteenth century frescoes with episodes from the life of Our Lady.

The two crosses on top of the roof show some similarities with Celtic crosses.

References

External links

Churches in Braga District
National monuments in Braga District
Vila Nova de Famalicão